Jon Lane Kent is a fictional character appearing in American comic books published by DC Comics. One of the several characters who has assumed the mantle of Superboy. He is the son of Superman and Lois Lane from an alternate future timeline in the continuity of the 2011 DC Comics initiative The New 52.

Fictional character biography

Superboy vol. 6
In an alternate New 52 future, Superman married Lois Lane and had a son, whom they named Jon Lane Kent. Jon's hybrid Kryptonian/human physiology proved to be unstable, causing him to fall ill and die shortly before his fourth birthday. In grief, Superman and Lois retreated to the Fortress of Solitude and were never heard from again.

However, this death was not the end for Jon. A time traveler from the 30th century, the man who would later be known as Harvest, arrived and retrieved Jon's body, recognizing his condition to be a kind of torpor rather than true death. Using future technology and chronal energy he had infused his own body with, Harvest revived Jon and took him as his own son, intending to use him as a weapon against metahumans. He trained Jon to hate all metahumans, despite being one himself, and the two lead a genocidal campaign against metahumans.

In time, Jon again succumbed to the same condition that nearly took his life before, and Harvest swore to find a way to save him. He took Jon back in time, to five years before the present day, where he retrieved genetic samples from Superman and Lois. He went on to found the organization N.O.W.H.E.R.E., and by combining the genetic samples from Superman, Lois, and Jon, created a clone, who would come to be known as Superboy and "Kon-El", who he hoped to use to find a way to treat Jon's condition.

Forever Evil
During the 2013–2014 "Forever Evil" storyline, the Teen Titans, after a battle with the Crime Syndicate's Johnny Quick and Atomica, are sent traveling through time, arriving in the alternate future where Jon and Harvest wage war against metahumans. Here Jon encounters his clone, Kon-El, and the two battle. Kon-El defeats his vicious progenitor, but before he can finish him off, is summoned through time by the Oracle, leading to the "Krypton Returns" story arc. Jon is then recovered and treated by the future versions of Beast Boy and Ravager, who present him to the Titans as Kon-El. The Titans take Jon with them as they continued time travelling.

With Kon-El apparently having been killed off in the "Krypton Returns" crossover storyline, Jon takes over as the lead character of the Superboy comic book with issue #26. Awakening in the year 2933, Jon meets Wonder Girl and quickly realizes the Titans (except for Raven) believe him to be Kon-El. He decided to maintain the masquerade and pose as Kon-El while secretly pursuing his anti-metahuman agenda.

Jon soon encountered a telepathic girl calling herself "Schiz", who claims to be one of a group of normal humans given powers artificially. She claims they were based on Jon and created to fight the metahumans, only to be put into stasis when the humans came to fear them as well. Jon and Schiz make plans to assemble these artificial metas into an army to serve Jon's plans to wage a genocidal war against metahumans in the present day.

Eventually, Jon encounters his future self (the genetic template for Kon-El) in the present—in stasis, dying from illness— and touching it, creates a temporal paradox which, through a lingering psychic connection to Kon-El who remains alive in the distant future, pulls them as well as Superboy Jons and Kons from across the Multiverse as well as other timelines to a pocket universe. The younger Jon teams up with Kon to fight against his older, psychotic self with help from Rose Wilson and Guardian, but find they are massively outmatched by him. The older Jon is even able to use his psionic powers to take control of the minds of the other Superboys, numbering in their hundreds, and siphon the power of a Green Lantern from one of the alternate worlds. The younger Jon heroically sacrifices himself to destroy the elder Jon, obliterating them both through his TK, sending all the other Jons and Kons back to their respective timelines, dimensions and universes. Jon isn't erased from history, and his actions outside of the pocket universe are well remembered, but he is truly gone, leaving Kon-El once again as Superboy.

Powers, abilities, and equipment
Similar to Kon-El, who possessed "tactile telekinesis", Jon is a powerful telekinetic. His telekinesis allows him to levitate and manipulate items around him, and even to analyze anything he touches. This allows him to mimic some of the powers of Superman, such as flight, superhuman strength, and superhuman speed. He can also absorb information about things in his vicinity, cloak himself from sight by bending light around himself, generate force fields, propel nearby objects as a projectile attack, and interfere with nearby machines, among other things. He is also shown to be able to absorb energy from metahumans he kills. Jon's psi powers also extend, to a limited degree, to low-level telepathy as well— sufficient to read unprotected minds, which assists him with pretending to be Kon-El even in the presence of Kon-El's closest friends. His human-alien hybrid physiology is also a weakness; it causes him constant pain and agony.

References

Characters created by Scott Lobdell
Comics characters introduced in 2013
DC Comics characters who can move at superhuman speeds 
DC Comics characters who have mental powers
DC Comics characters with superhuman strength
DC Comics supervillains
DC Comics superheroes
DC Comics male supervillains
DC Comics male superheroes 
DC Comics child superheroes
DC Comics telekinetics
DC Comics telepaths
DC Comics hybrids
Kryptonians
Fictional characters with absorption or parasitic abilities
Fictional characters with superhuman durability or invulnerability
Fictional characters who can manipulate light
Superheroes who are adopted
Fictional extraterrestrial–human hybrids in comics
Superman characters
Superboy